During the 1997–98 English football season, Stockport County F.C. competed in the First Division.

Season summary
Stockport's return to the second flight after an absence of 60 years appeared to be in danger of being written off as a failure before a ball had been kicked, as manager Dave Jones, who had led County to promotion and the League Cup semi-final the previous season, left to join Southampton, taking his assistant John Sainty, goalkeeper Paul Jones and defender Lee Todd with him to The Dell. Gary Megson was recruited from Blackpool as his replacement. Three points from the opening seven games left Stockport facing relegation, but four straight wins after that lifted Stockport up to eighth, signalling the end of their relegation fears for the season. These fears were replaced with hopes of finally reaching the top flight, but ultimately County's poor away form saw them finish in eighth, nine points off the play-offs. Of course, this was still as success, for this was Stockport's highest-ever placing in England's footballing ladder while at the same time this season was Manchester City's worst season in their history.

Final league table

Results
Stockport County's scores comes first

Legend

First Division
 Stockport County 3–1 Manchester City (Cook, Angell, Armstrong)
 Manchester City 4–1 Stockport County

FA Cup

League Cup

Squad
Squad at end of season

Left club during season

References

Stockport County F.C. seasons
Sto